Wish You Were Here is a novel written by American novelist Jodi Picoult. It was first published by Ballantine Books in 2021.

References 

2021 American novels
 Novels by {{}} Picoult
Ballantine Books books